Jody J. Daniels (born ) is a lieutenant general in the United States Army, who serves as the 34th Chief of the United States Army Reserve, and the 9th Commanding General, United States Army Reserve Command since 2020. She earned her commission through Reserve Officers Training Corps in 1983. In July 2020, Daniels was confirmed to succeed Lieutenant General Charles D. Luckey as Chief of Army Reserve.

Education

Born in Rolla, Missouri, Daniels earned her bachelor's degree at Carnegie Mellon University in 1983, and later completed a Doctor of Philosophy in computer science at University of Massachusetts Amherst. Her dissertation, in computer science, is titled Retrieval of passages for information reduction. She also graduated from the United States Army War College with a master's degree in strategic studies.

In Daniels' civilian career, she was the Director of Advanced Programs for Lockheed Martin's Advanced Technology Laboratories.

Awards and decorations

References

Living people
Female generals of the United States Army
Women in the Iraq War
United States Army personnel of the Iraq War
Carnegie Mellon University alumni
University of Massachusetts Amherst alumni
United States Army reservists
United States Army generals
United States Army War College alumni
Year of birth missing (living people)
21st-century American women